WSUN may refer to:

 WSUN (FM), a radio station (97.1 FM) licensed to Holiday, Florida, United States
 WSUN-TV, a defunct television station (channel 38) in St. Petersburg, Florida, United States
 WSUN (AM), a radio station in Tampa Bay Area, Florida, United States known as WSUN from 1927 until 1999